Matthew Kwok Hon-ming (also Kwok Hon-ming, ; born April 18, 1979) is a Hong Kong former swimmer, who specialized in breaststroke events. He is a single-time Olympian (2000), and a member of the University of Hawaii swimming and diving team under head coach Sam Freas. He also holds numerous Hong Kong records in the 100 m breaststroke, and retains a dual resident status to compete internationally for his father's homeland. Kwok is also a younger brother of Olympic swimmer and Asian Games bronze medalist Mark Kwok.

Kwok competed only in the men's 100 m breaststroke at the 2000 Summer Olympics in Sydney. He posted a FINA B-standard entry time of 1:05.29 from the Hong Kong Long Course Championships. He challenged seven other swimmers in heat three, including Namibia's three-time Olympian Jorg Lindemeier. He posted a lifetime best of 1:05.28 to pick up a fifth seed by three hundredths of a second (0.03) behind Lindemeier. Kwok failed to advance into the semifinals, as he placed fiftieth overall on the first day of prelims.

References

External links
 HK Swim Bio 

1979 births
Living people
Hong Kong male breaststroke swimmers
Olympic swimmers of Hong Kong
Swimmers at the 2000 Summer Olympics
People from Laguna Hills, California
Sportspeople from Orange County, California
Swimmers from California
American people of Hong Kong descent
Hong Kong people of American descent
Hawaii Rainbow Warriors swimmers
University of Hawaiʻi alumni
Swimmers at the 1998 Asian Games
Asian Games competitors for Hong Kong